Typhlotanaidae is a family of crustaceans belonging to the order Tanaidacea.

Genera:
 Antiplotanais Bamber, 2008
 Aremus Segadilha, Gellert & Błażewicz, 2018
 Dimorphognathia Sieg, 1986
 Larsenotanais Blazewicz-Paszkowycz, 2007
 Meromonakantha Sieg, 1986
 Obesutanais Larsen, Blazewicz-Paszkowycz & Cunha, 2006
 Paratyphlotanais Kudinova-Pasternak & Pasternak, 1978
 Peraeospinosus Sieg, 1986
 Pulcherella Blazewicz-Paszkowycz, 2007
 Targaryenella Błażewicz & Segadilha, 2019
 Torquella Blazewicz-Paszkowycz, 2007
 Typhlamia Blazewicz-Paszkowycz, 2007
 Typhlotanais Sars, 1882
 Typhlotanaoides Sieg, 1983

References

Tanaidacea
Crustacean families